The 2021 Hlinka Gretzky Cup is an under-18 international ice hockey tournament that was held in Piešťany, Slovakia and Břeclav, Czech Republic from 2 to 7 August 2021 at FOSFA Aréna in Břeclav and Easton Arena in Piešťany.

Preliminary round
All times are local (UTC+2).

Group A

Group B

Final round

Bracket

Seventh place game

Fifth place game

Semifinals

Bronze medal game

Final

Final ranking

Statistics

Scoring leaders

GP = Games played; G = Goals; A = Assists; Pts = Points; +/− = Plus–minus; PIM = Penalties In MinutesSource: hockeyslovakia.sk

Goaltending leaders
(minimum 40% team's total ice time)

TOI = Time on ice (minutes:seconds); GA = Goals against; GAA = Goals against average; SA = Shots against; Sv% = Save percentage; SO = ShutoutsSource: hockeyslovakia.sk

References

Hlinka Gretzky Cup
2021
International ice hockey competitions hosted by Slovakia
International ice hockey competitions hosted by the Czech Republic
Ivan
Ivan
Hlinka Gretzky Cup
Hlinka Gretzky Cup